Panwar is a Rajput clan found in Northern India.

Panwar may also refer to:

People 
Aalisha Panwar (born 1996), Indian television actress 
Arvind Panwar (born 1990), Indian cyclist
Harpal Singh Panwar (born 1945), Indian politician, member of Indian Parliament (specifically Lok Sabha) and Indian government minister 
Hemendra Singh Panwar, Indian conservationist 
Krishan Lal Panwar, Indian politician, member of the Haryana Legislative Assembly and a Minister in Government of Haryana 
Lalit K. Panwar, Indian Administrative Service (IAS) officer
Manisha Panwar, Indian politician, member of the Rajasthan Legislative Assembly
Pritam Singh Panwar, Indian politician, member of the Uttarakhand Legislative Assembly
Sahil Panwar (born 1999), Indian footballer 
Sangeeta Panwar (born 1969), Indian television actor
Surendra Singh Panwar (1919–2002), Indian Army artillery officer
Vaibhav Singh Panwar (born 1992), Indian cricketer
Vineet Panwar (born 1998), Indian cricketer

Monarchs 
 Panwar dynasty

See also 
 Paramara dynasty